

Jack is an English hero and archetypal stock character appearing in multiple legends, fairy tales, and nursery rhymes.

Examples of Jack tales 
Some of the most famous Jack tales are "Jack and the Beanstalk", "Jack Frost", "Jack the Giant Killer", "Little Jack Horner" and "This Is the House That Jack Built". While these heroes are not necessarily congruous, their concepts are related and in some instances interchangeable.

Nature 
Jack is generally portrayed as a young adult. Unlike moralizing fairy heroes, Jack is often lazy or foolish, but emerges triumphant through wit and trickery, resembling the trickster or rebel archetypes. Some of the stories feature Jack's brothers, Will and Tom. The notional "Jack" corresponds with the German Hans (or Hänsel) and the Russian Ivan the Fool. Some Jack tales feature themes that appear to originate from Germanic folk tales.

Jack tales in Appalachia 
"Jack tales" are present in Appalachian folklore. As noted by the folklorist Herbert Halpert, the Appalachian Jack tales are analogous to many of the folk songs of Appalachia, being passed on orally rather than in writing, and tracing back to sources in England. In the Appalachian Jack tales, where the English original would feature a king or other noble, the Appalachian Jack tale version would have a sheriff.

In his book The Jack Tales American folklorist Richard Chase collected many popular Appalachian Jack tales as told by descendants of a man named Council Harmon (1803–1896), whose grandfather Cutliff Harmon (1748–1838) was believed by Chase to have brought the Jack tales to America. One notable descendant of Council Harmon known for the telling of Jack Tales was Ray Hicks, whose relatives continue to keep the oral tradition alive. The Harmon-Hicks family are also known for their unique repertoire of traditional British folk ballads.

See also
Jack (name)
Jack Be Nimble
Jack Frost
Jack Frost (Marvel Comics)
Jack Horner (comics)
Jack Sprat
Jack and His Comrades
Jack and His Golden Snuff-Box
Jack and Jill
Jack and the Beanstalk
Jack in the green
Jack o' Kent
Jack-o'-lantern
Jack of all trades, master of none
Jack of Fables
Jack the Giant Killer
Jack the Ripper
Spring-heeled Jack
Stingy Jack
Will-o'-the-wisp

Suggested reading
 William Bernard McCarthy, Cheryl Oxford and Joseph Daniel Sobol, Jack in Two Worlds: Contemporary North American Tales and Their Tellers, University of North Carolina Press (1994), 
 Julia Taylor Ebel, Orville Hicks: Mountain Stories, Mountain Roots, Parkway Publishers (2005), 
 Duncan Williamson, Don't Look Back, Jack!: Scottish Traveller Tales, Canongate Books (1990)

References

Further reading

External links

 Folktale Transcripts, 1976-1990, Series 1. Archives of Appalachia.

List of Jack tales at ferrum.edu
Jack tales at ibiblio.org
Audio recording of a traditional Jack tale (Streaming and downloadable formats)

American folklore
Appalachian culture
English folklore
Cornish folklore
Heroes in mythology and legend
 
Fairy tale stock characters
Legendary English people
Male characters in literature
Male characters in fairy tales